System 6 (or System Software 6) is a graphical user interface-based operating system for Macintosh computers, made by Apple Computer It was released in 1988, and is part of the classic Mac OS series. It is a monolithic operating system, with cooperative multitasking based on an improved MultiFinder. The boxed version cost , and it was included with all new Macintosh computers until 1991, when it was succeeded by System 7.

Overview

MacroMaker
The MacroMaker utility was introduced in System 6. It records mouse and keyboard input as macros, and has a unique user interface intended to look and act like a tape recorder. MacroMaker was criticized for its lack of features when compared to Microsoft's AutoMac III, which was already available commercially. As MacroMaker records only the locations of mouse-clicks inside windows and not what is being clicked on or exactly when, it can not be used to automate actions in more sophisticated programs. The pre-recorded clicks miss buttons if the buttons had moved since the recording, or if they failed to appear upon playback. It records the start and end locations of mouse movements, but does not track the precise path of a movement or support pauses. MacroMaker is not compatible with System 7, in which it is succeeded by AppleScript.

Multitasking
Macintosh gained cooperative multitasking in March 1985 with Andy Hertzfeld's Switcher, which can switch between multiple full-screen applications. It was not integrated, and was only sold separately by Apple. Not many programs and features function correctly with Switcher, and it does not share the screen between applications simultaneously. Systems 5 and 6 have MultiFinder instead, which is much more mature and widely used in System 6. With MultiFinder, the Finder does not quit to free resources, and the system behaves as in the still-familiar multitasking fashion, with the desktop and other applications' windows in the background.

Hardware support
System 6 includes support for the Apple ImageWriter LQ and PostScript laser printers. New software drivers allow the ImageWriter LQ to be used on AppleTalk local area networks and supports the use of tabloid or B-size paper. System 6 includes QuickerGraf (originally QuickerDraw), system software used to accelerate the drawing of color images on the Macintosh II. It was licensed to Apple and Radius Inc by its programmer, Andy Hertzfeld.

Limitations
In comparison to the NeXTSTEP operating system of the time, System 6 does not make much use of sound, and its user interface is limited in file management and window displays. System 6's Apple menu cannot be used to launch applications. The icon in the upper right-hand corner of the menu bar simply shows the open application and is not a menu. System 6 supports 24 bits of addressable RAM (random access memory), which allows for a maximum of 8 megabytes of RAM, with no provision for virtual memory. These limitations were removed in System 7. System 6's version of the HFS file system also has a volume size limit; it supports up to 2 gigabytes (GB) and 65,536 files on any one volume. System 7.5 increased this limit to 4 GB.

The Trash (known as the "Wastebasket" in the British-English version) empties when the Finder terminates. If MultiFinder is not running, this occurs as soon as an application launches. Icons on the Desktop in System 6 are not organized into a single folder, as in later operating systems. Instead, the system records if a file is on the Desktop. This is inefficient and confusing, as the user cannot browse to the Desktop in applications besides the Finder, even within the standard Open and Save As dialog boxes. Furthermore, these dialogs are primitive, and were mostly unchanged since 1984. The lack of aliases, shortcuts to files, is another limitation of file management on System 6, and custom file and folder icons are not supported. These issues were all remedied in System 7.

A maximum of 15 desk accessories may be installed at one time, including the Chooser, Scrapbook, and Control Panel. System 6 uses the Control Panel desk accessory to access all the installed control panels, which imposes severe user-interface limitations. Desk Accessories cannot be installed or removed within the Finder; this requires the Font/DA Mover utility. System 7 also fixed this. Control Panels, however, are contained in separate files.

The interface is not very customizable. The Finder allows each icon to be assigned a color, but the desktop background is limited to an 8x8-pixel color tiled pattern (color patterns were introduced in System 5), and standard window frames are black-and-white. However, many "INIT" extension files exist to add color and customization. System 7 allows the user to change the color of window frames and various other aspects of the user interface. By 1989, the System 6 user interface was in need of a change.

Reception
Initial releases of System 6 are unstable; many third-party developers did not receive advance copies, resulting in widespread compatibility issues. The contemporary versions of many common programs such as Microsoft Excel, Microsoft Works and 4th Dimension were not fully compatible with System 6. There were also software bugs in the Color Manager, Script Manager, and Sound Manager extension files. Apple announced that 66 bugs were fixed with version 6.0.1 update, in September 1988. However, a major bug involving the text-spacing of screen fonts was found, and was fixed in version 6.0.2. Some customers waited longer until moving to System 6 because of its poor reputation.

Compatibility
System 6 was officially supported by Apple for many different machines, some of which shipped with it. Some unsupported Macintosh computers can run it with limitations.

Version history

Timeline

References

External links
Macintosh: System Software Version History at apple.com

1988 software
Classic Mac OS
Proprietary operating systems
Pascal (programming language) software